Hesar-e Meydan Daghi (also Romanized as Ḩeşār-e Meydān Dāghī; also known as Ḩeşār) is a village in Kandovan Rural District, Kandovan District, Meyaneh County, East Azerbaijan Province, Iran. At the 2006 census, its population was 198, in 40 families.

References 

Populated places in Meyaneh County